Raspberry pie is a type of pie with a raspberry filling. The primary ingredients include raspberries, sugar, lemon juice, salt, and butter. A common variant of raspberry pie is raspberry cream pies, which are raspberry pies with cream added. Raspberry pie is eaten around the world, and the specific region of origin of raspberry pie is unknown.

National Raspberry Cream Pie Day is a holiday that takes place every year on August 1 in celebration of raspberry cream pies. Raspberries are plentiful that time of year in the Northern Hemisphere and people often bake raspberry pies.

See also 
 List of pies, tarts and flans

References 

Fruit pies
Pie